The wheelchair rugby event at the 2015 Parapan American Games was run from 8–14 August 2015 at the Mississauga Sports Centre in Mississauga. Six countries contested the gold medal which was won by the host nation, Canada. Despite being a mixed gender sport, Colombia were the only team to field a female athlete. This was the first time wheelchair rugby had been contested at the Parapan American Games.

The event was contested as a round robin competition in its first stage, with the first placed team playing the fourth and the second placed team playing the third in the semi-finals. The losing semi-finalists faced each other for the bronze medal.

Medal summary

Medal table

Medal event

First round

Day 1

Day 2

Day 3

Day 4

Day 5

First round table

Medal round
Bracket

References

External links
Wheelchair Rugby Results

Events at the 2015 Parapan American Games
Wheelchair rugby at the Parapan American Games